Goldbelly is an online marketplace for food products. Customers can order products from restaurants, bakeries, delis, etc. and have them shipped across the United States. The ordered food sometimes requires preparation and cooking.

History 
Founded as "Goldbely" by Joe Ariel, the company began its operation from a townhouse in Noe Valley in San Francisco with a four-person team of Ariel, Trevor Stow, Vanessa Torrivilla and Joel Gillman. The site was accepted into Y Combinator in 2013. Time magazine named Goldbelly one of the 50 Best Websites of 2013. In 2013, Goldbelly closed on $3 million seed funding led by Intel Capital.

In 2017 the company moved its headquarters from San Francisco to New York City. In October 2018, the company changed their name from Goldbely (with one L) to Goldbelly (with two Ls), raised $20 million in Series B funding led by Enlightened Hospitality Investments, the fund formed by Danny Meyer's Union Square Hospitality Group, and had Danny Meyer join the company's advisory board.

In 2021, Goldbelly announced that they raised $100 million in new funding. As of May 2021, 850 restaurants sell food on the Goldbelly platform, 400 of which joined after the start of the COVID-19 pandemic.

Reception

According to one review, as some of the food is frozen, the experience can sometimes differ from the taste customers get at the restaurant.

References

External links 

Foodie generation' willing to pay up for iconic food brands: Goldbelly CEO". CNBC. December 27, 2017.

Websites about food and drink
Online marketplaces of the United States
Y Combinator companies
500 Startups companies
American companies established in 2013
Retail companies established in 2013
2013 establishments in California
Companies based in New York City